Mark Kiyimba is a Ugandan Unitarian Universalist minister and activist for LGBT rights in Uganda. He founded and leads the Unitarian Universalist Church of Kampala, Uganda; the church runs an orphanage and a school for children infected with HIV/AIDS and who have lost parents to the disease.

Activism 
He has been a vocal opponent of Uganda's Anti-Homosexuality Bill; in 2010, he organized a conference (held on February 14) called "Standing on the Side of Love: Reimagining Valentine’s Day", to protest the bill. He has taken his opposition to the United States, seeking support for his mission.

Recognition 
The National Education Association awarded him its 2012 Virginia Uribe Award for Creative Leadership in Human Rights.

References

Further reading

External links
New Life Uganda

Living people
Ugandan clergy
Unitarian Universalist clergy
Ugandan LGBT rights activists
Year of birth missing (living people)